The city of Perryville, Missouri, located in Missouri's 8th congressional district in southeastern Missouri, is the county seat and the largest city of Perry County, Missouri.  The city was incorporated in 1831.

List of Mayors

Perryville mayors since 1882.

References
 Missouri Secretary of State official manuals

Key

Perryville